The  2022 Zhytomyr attacks on the civilian airport of Zhytomyr took place on 27 February 2022 as part of the 2022 Russian invasion of Ukraine. Attacks on the city itself followed in March. It was reported that the Russian armed forces used 9K720 Iskander missile systems that were located in Belarus.

Timeline

February 

On February 24, at 5:40 a.m., Ozerne Air Base in the suburbs was shelled.

On February 27, Russian occupation forces used 9K720 Iskander missiles in Belarus to strike the Zhytomyr civilian airport.

March 
Late in the evening of March 1, Russian troops hit a residential sector of the city. The city hospital and about ten residential buildings on Shukhevych street were damaged. Bombs were dropped on the city. As a result, at least two civilian Ukrainians were killed and three were injured. 

On March 2, shells hit the regional perinatal center and some private houses.

On March 4, rockets hit the 25th Zhytomyr school, destroying half of the school. In the evening, the "Ozerne and Zhytomyr Armored Plant" came under fire; two people were injured. 

In an air assault on March 8, a dormitory was hit and the Isovat insulation factory was damaged. 

On March 9, the outskirts of the city (Ozerne district) came under fire. 

On March 25, a military facility was shelled by Russian forces.

June 
On June 25, 24 Russian missiles hit several military bases in and around Zhytomyr, these missiles were reportedly launched by Russian forces in Belarus.

August 
On August 16, the Zhytomyr region again came under shelling, two explosions were reported on a military airport; The runway, as well as repair equipment, were damaged during the attack. According to the governor of the Zhytomyr Oblast, Vitaliy Bunechko, the missiles that hit the airport were launched from Belarusian territory.

October 
On October 10, during the series of Russian strikes against Ukrainian energy infrastructure, two missiles were launched against Zhytomyr, one was reportedly shot down, while the other hit critical energy infrastructure, which led to some parts of the region to have blackouts.

November 
On November 15, during an air raid in Zhytomyr, explosions were reported at key energy infrastructure in the city, which caused blackouts and partial lack of water in the city.

December 
On December 16, two Russian missiles were launched at Zhytomyr, energy infrastructure in the city was reportedly hit.

See also 
 Russian occupation of Zhytomyr Oblast

References 

Kyiv offensive (2022)
War crimes during the 2022 Russian invasion of Ukraine
Attacks on airports
Attacks on buildings and structures in 2022
Attacks on buildings and structures in Europe
Airport attack
History of Zhytomyr Oblast
February 2022 events in Ukraine
March 2022 events in Ukraine
Airstrikes during the 2022 Russian invasion of Ukraine

Airstrikes conducted by Russia